The 2014 BYU Cougars softball team represents Brigham Young University in the 2014 NCAA Division I softball season. Gordon Eakin enters the year as head coach of the Cougars for a 12th consecutive season. The Cougars enter 2014 being in their fourth conference in four years time. In 2011 the Cougars were part of the Mountain West Conference. In 2012 they joined the Western Athletic Conference for softball only. In 2013 they were part of the Pacific Coast Softball Conference, and in 2014 they join the West Coast Conference. The WCC is in its first season hosting softball after Pacific joined the conference, giving them the six members needed to host softball for the conference. The Cougars have won their last 3 conference championships and enter 2014 as the favorites in the WCC. The Cougars would win the conference championship with a sweep of Saint Mary's April 9 and qualify for their tenth consecutive NCAA softball tournament. After upsetting Northwestern on Thursday, the Cougars would lose twice on Friday to be eliminated from the Eugene region with a 34–23 overall record.

2014 Roster

Coaching staff
BYU entered the 2014 season with two new assistants. At the end of the 2013 season assistant coach Vaughn Alvey announced his retirement after 11 seasons with the Cougars. Meanwhile Ianeta Le'i left BYU to pursue other interests after 7 seasons with the Cougars. To replace the departing assistants, Gordon Eakin would interview and hire former Cougar alum Kristin Delahoussaye, who had been serving as an assistant softball and strength coach at Dixie State College and Salt Lake City Pitching Academy head coach Peter Meredith.

Schedule 

|-
!colspan=10 style="background:#002654; color:#FFFFFF;"| Red Desert Classic

 

|-
!colspan=10 style="background:#002654; color:#FFFFFF;"| Easton Desert Classic

|-
!colspan=10 style="background:#002654; color:#FFFFFF;"| Mary Nutter Classic

|-
!colspan=10 style="background:#002654; color:#FFFFFF;"| San Diego Classic

|-
!colspan=10 style="background:#002654; color:#FFFFFF;"| Stanford Louisville Slugger Classic 

|-
!colspan=10 style="background:#002654; color:#FFFFFF;"| Pepsi Rainbow Wahine Classic 

|-
!colspan=10 style="background:#002654; color:#FFFFFF;"| Deseret First Duel

|-
!colspan=10 style="background:#002654; color:#FFFFFF;"| Regular Season

|-
!colspan=10 style="background:#002654;"| 2014 NCAA Regionals

TV, Radio, and Streaming Information
During the 2014 season BYUtv broadcast 8 home games:  Apr. 11 & 12 (DH) vs. Santa Clara, Apr. 18 vs. Weber State, Apr. 25 (DH) vs. Loyola Marymount, and May 9 (DH) vs. Saint Mary's. Spencer Linton acted as the play-by-play man for these games while former Cougar softball coach Vaughn Alvey provided the analysis. 

TheW.tv streamed 11 home games: Mar. 25 vs. Oregon, Mar. 28 & 29 (DH) vs. Idaho State, Apr. 2 vs. Utah State, Apr. 15 (DH) vs. Southern Utah, Apr. 26 vs. Loyola Marymount, May 6 (DH) vs. Utah Valley, and May 10 vs. Saint Mary's. Robbie Bullough provided play-by-play for 9 games while Ty Brandenburg provided play-by-play for the Utah Valley double header. Bailey Higgins provided analysis for all but the Oregon game.

The Mar. 20 game at Utah was broadcast by Pac-12 Network with Krista Blunk providing play-by-play and Teri Goldberg providing the analysis.

BYU Radio would provide a game broadcast for two road games during the season. The Apr. 8 game at Utah Valley and the Apr. 30 game at Weber State would have a radio only broadcast with Ty Brandenburg providing the call. They would also simulcast all BYUtv games.

Road games at Pacific (Pacific Portal), at San Diego State (MW Network), at Weber State (Watch Big Sky), and at Utah Valley (YouTube) had streams available through the opponents athletic websites. All games during the Rainbow Wahine Classic would stream on BigWest.tv.

The NCAA Regional games vs. Northwestern had an audio broadcast online via NUsports.com with Doug Meffley providing the call. Mike Brown provided the NCAA Regional game vs. Washington on Gohuskies.com.

External links 
 BYU TheW.tv archive on Livestream

References 

BYU
BYU Cougars softball seasons
BYU Cougars softball